Paul Henry Gore-Booth, Baron Gore-Booth  (3 February 1909 – 29 June 1984) was a British diplomat. He served with distinction in HM Diplomatic Service and in retirement held the following appointments: Director, Grindlays Bank, 1969–79, United Kingdom Provident Institution, 1969–79 and Registrar of the Order of St Michael and St George, 1966–79.

Lord Gore-Booth was educated at Eton and Balliol. After Oxford, he married in 1940, Patricia Mary Ellerton, by whom he had twin sons, one of whom was Sir David Gore-Booth, and two daughters. His aunt was the Irish republican and socialist revolutionary, Countess Constance Markievicz (née Gore-Booth).

Career
Gore-Booth joined the British Foreign Service in 1933, serving in the Foreign Office in London from 1933 to 1936, and then was stationed in Vienna, 1936–37, Tokyo, 1938–42, and Washington, 1942–45, where he attended the Hot Springs Food Conference in 1943. He returned to the Foreign Office in London, 1945–49, attending the UNRRA Conference, 1943, the Chicago Civil Aviation Conference, 1944, the San Francisco Conference, 1945, and the UN Assembly, January and October 1946 (as Secretary of the UK Delegation), and in 1947 as the British Representative, Group of Four Drafting Convention setting up the Organisation for Economic Co-operation and Development. He served as Head of the UN Economic and Social and Refugees Departments, 1947–48; Head of European Recovery Department, Foreign Office, 1948–49; Director of British Information Services in United States, 1949–53; Ambassador to Burma, 1953–56; Deputy Under-Secretary (Economic Affairs), Foreign Office, 1956–60; British High Commissioner in India, 1960–65; Permanent Under-Secretary of State, Foreign Office, 1965–69; and Head of HM Diplomatic Service, 1968–69.

Gore-Booth also served as President of the Sherlock Holmes Society of London, 1967–79; Chairman, Save the Children Fund, 1970–76; Chairman, Windsor Music Festival, 1971–73; Member, Disasters Emergency Committee, 1974–77; Chairman, Board of Governors, School of Oriental and African Studies, University of London, 1975–80.

Gore-Booth was an adviser at the time of the Chagossian Diaspora in 1968, and apparently supported their expulsion.

Honours and arms

 CMG (1949), KCMG (1957), GCMG (1965);
 KCVO (1961);
Life Peer as Baron Gore-Booth, of Maltby in the West Riding of the County of York (cr. 2 July 1969).

Works
 With Great Truth and Respect (autobiog.) 1974
 Satow's Guide to Diplomatic Practice, 5th edn, 1978.

See also
 Gore baronets
 Booth baronets

References

External links
 www.burkespeerage.com

1909 births
1984 deaths
People educated at Eton College
Alumni of Balliol College, Oxford
Crossbench life peers
Knights Grand Cross of the Order of St Michael and St George
Knights Commander of the Royal Victorian Order
Ambassadors of the United Kingdom to Myanmar
High Commissioners of the United Kingdom to India
Permanent Under-Secretaries of State for Foreign Affairs
Members of HM Diplomatic Service
Paul
20th-century British diplomats
Life peers created by Elizabeth II